Allama Ḥabīburraḥmān Ṣiddīqī Kāndhalvī (1924-1991) was an Islamic scholar and author from Pakistan.

Early life and career
He was born in December 1924, Mohalla Delhi Darwaza, Delhi, India in the home of Mufti Ishfaq ur Rehman Kandhalvi. He memorized the Qur'an at the age of 9 years. During his education in Madrasa Siddiquia he used to visit Naziria Library and read many books about the Islamic history especially the Sirat-un-Nabi from Maulana Shibli Nomani which had lasting impression on him. After completing his religious education, he came to Sialkot, Punjab in 1944-1945 and soon thereafter moved to Gujranwala where he started delivering his regular Dars-e-Quran. After the independence of Pakistan in 1947, all of his family moved to Pakistan and he started working in Bahawalpur and later in Tando Jam, Sindh. He started doing translation of various Islamic literature. After his marriage in 1960, he moved to Karachi and initially started working for the famous religious book publishing firm, Taj Company.

He died on 18 April 1991.

Bibliography

References

External links
 Research on the age of Ayesha (wife of the prophet) in Urdu language by Habibur Rahman Kandhalvi
 Habibur Rahman Kandhalvi's speech on YouTube
 Aqeeda Zahoor-e-Mahdi (Urdu), edition on Scribd
 Mazhabi Dastanein aur un ki Haqeeqat Part 1
 Mazhabi Dastanein aur un ki Haqeeqat Part 3
 Mazhabi Dastanein aur un ki Haqeeqat Part 4
 Shab-e-Barat Kiya hey

1924 births
1991 deaths
20th-century Muslim scholars of Islam
Pakistani writers